Douwe Draaisma (Nijverdal, 1953) is a Dutch psychologist and university professor who specializes in the basis and mechanisms of the human memory. He studied psychology and philosophy at the University of Groningen, where he is now a professor by special appointment in the history of psychology. He holds the Heymans Chair. Draaisma was appointed Officer of the Order of Orange-Nassau for his achievements in the academic world in April 2014.

Career
Draaisma is the author of a number of very successful books, which have been translated into twenty-five languages. He received several awards for his Waarom het leven sneller gaat als je ouder wordt. The book was translated into English (Why life speeds up as you get older), French (Pourquoi la vie passe plus vite à mesure qu'on vieillit) and German (Warum das Leben schneller vergeht, wenn man älter wird: von den Rätseln unserer Erinnerung). On 25 April 2014 Draaisma was appointed Officer of the Order of Orange-Nassau for his achievements in the academic world.

Bibliography (sel.) 
 Metaphors of Memory. Groningen: Historische Uitgeverij, 1995 (Third revision 2003)
 Why life speeds up as you get older. Groningen: Historische Uitgeverij, 2001
 Disturbances of the Mind. Groningen: Historische Uitgeverij, 2006
 The Nostalgia Factory. Groningen: Historische Uitgeverij, 2008
 Forgetting. Groningen: Historische Uitgeverij, 2010
 The Dreamweaver. Groningen: Historische Uitgeverij, 2013
 If My Memory Doesn't Deceive me. Groningen: Historische Uitgeverij, 2016

Awards 
 Heymans Award 1990
 Jan Greshoff Award 2002
 Jan Hanlo Essay Award 2003
 Eureka! Award, 2003

References 

1953 births
Living people
Dutch psychologists
Academic staff of the University of Groningen
University of Groningen alumni
People from Hellendoorn